is a public university in Kobe, Hyōgo, Japan. The predecessor of the school was founded in 1959, and it was chartered as a university in 1996.

External links

 Official website 

Educational institutions established in 1959
Public universities in Japan
Universities and colleges in Hyōgo Prefecture
1959 establishments in Japan